The Deserter is a 1970 Italian-Yugoslav American international co-production Western film produced by Dino De Laurentiis. It was directed by Burt Kennedy and written by Clair Huffaker.

Scripted during the Vietnam War in the style of The Dirty Dozen (1967) with a party of professional or misfit soldiers going into an enemy sanctuary, it was designed as a vehicle for Yugoslavian theater and film matinee idol Bekim Fehmiu. The film featured an ensemble cast of well-known American actors. Noted as the boy in Shane (1953), actor Brandon deWilde appears in his last Western film before his death in 1972.

Plot
A US Army cavalry unit returns from a two week patrol to find the inhabitants of a Christian mission near its home fort have been killed by Apache Indians. Among the victims is the savagely tortured wife of the patrol's leader, Capt. Victor Kaleb (Bekim Fehmiu). Still alive after she was skinned alive, Kaleb has to execute his wife to take her out of her terminal pain.

Kaleb believes part of the fault lies with the passive fort commander, Major Wade Brown (Richard Crenna) and loudly criticizes him  in front of his command. Major Brown responds to Captain Kaleb by asking whether it was the Apaches or him who shot his wife. Captain Kaleb responds by shooting Major Brown in his leg and arm, then deserts the army. He disappears into the southwestern frontier to wage a private one man war of revenge against the Apache.

Two years later General Miles (John Huston) arrives at the fort with criticism of now Colonel Brown's unsuccessful military command and an offer of pardon for Kaleb. The scouts Natchai (Ricardo Montalbán) and Tattinger (Slim Pickens), old friends of Kaleb, are sent out to entice him (and his pet wolf-dog) back to the fort. With a bit of trickery they succeed.

General Miles tells Kaleb that Apaches led by Chief Mangus Durango have gathered in Mexico, intending to cross the border and attack at any time. As the United States Army is prohibited from entering Mexico, the General, over Brown’s objections, promises Kaleb amnesty in exchange for leading a select band of soldiers in plain clothes across the border to wipe out the Apache stronghold known as "La Spina Dorsale Del Diavolo", the Devil's Backbone.

In a reversal of the scenario of The Dirty Dozen, the formerly wanted Kaleb has his pick of the soldiers at the fort for his mission. Those willing to go on the mission include dynamite expert Reynolds (Chuck Connors), who also is an Army Chaplain, knife-fighting expert and military prisoner Corporal Jackson (Woody Strode), Gatling gun expert Captain Robinson (Patrick Wayne), grizzled veteran Quartermaster Sergeant Schmidt (Albert Salmi) and young army Lt. Ferguson (Brandon deWilde). A blustery Englishman, Crawford (Ian Bannen), sent by the British Army to study frontier tactics is selected by Kaleb's wolf dog. Kaleb selects the post's surgeon Dr. Robinson (Larry Stewart). Most of the men hate Kaleb, especially Trooper O'Toole (John Alderson).

Kaleb leads them into the desert to train them for the mission. It is severe, and results in a death of one of the party. The band also encounters Apaches, who they kill. On their return to the fort, Major Brown reveals that, despite the general’s amnesty offer, he intends to arrest Kaleb for having shot him two years ago. In response the general orders Brown to accompany Kaleb on the mission. Brown cannot disobey. Natchai and Tattinger go along as well.

They cross the border and successfully infiltrate the Apache stronghold of The Devil's Backbone by bringing their mounts and equipment up hazardous cliffs. After a successful smaller attack on part of the Apaches, due to one man's sense of morality the rest of the Apaches are alerted leading to a fierce battle with the main body of the Apaches. Kaleb's elite force wins, in large part due to the advantages proffered by dynamite and machine gun fire. The victorious survivors return to the fort, where an embarrassed General Miles explains that despite his amnesty offer he has been ordered to arrest Kaleb. Colonel Brown suggests the resolution: they will all say Kaleb was killed in action at the Devil's Backbone. Kaleb mounts up and rides away from the fort back into the desert.

Cast

Production
Bekim Fehmiu who had starred as Ulysses in Dino De Laurentiis' 1968 television miniseries L'Odissea had recently starred in Paramount's The Adventurers (1970).

The film was shot largely on location in Italy, Spain and Yugoslavia. Many exterior scenes were filmed at the Fort Bowie set built in the Province of Almería, Spain, where the desert landscape and climate that characterizes part of the province have made it a much utilized setting for Western films, among those A Fistful of Dollars (1964), The Good, the Bad and the Ugly (1966) and later 800 Bullets (2002). This same set was also used in the films Blindman (1971) with Ringo Starr and A Reason to Live, a Reason to Die (1972).

Reception
In his investigation of narrative structures in Spaghetti Western films, Fridlund writes that The Deserter mainly follows the "Professional Plot", as described by Will Wright in his analysis of American Westerns, that is the cooperation of a group of professionals fulfilling a mission.

Home media

Video
The Deserter was originally released on VHS in the United States by Paramount Home Entertainment, on September 9, 1992. Paramount has not released the film as a DVD in North American Region 1. It was available at one time in DVD Region 0 by East West Entertainment LLC in standard non-widescreen VHS conversion and Region 4 by Reel Corporation, Australia.

Soundtrack
The score for The Deserter had music composed and conducted by Piero Piccioni. Originally a practicing lawyer securing movie rights for Italian film  distributors, he was eventually credited with scoring over 300 films. Piccioni was influenced in his use of jazz by 20th century classical composers and American cinematography and this is apparent in The Deserter soundtrack.

Piccioni's score was released on CD in Italy in 1997 on the Legend label, as CD 28, 14-tracks under the title Piero Piccioni: La Spina Dorsale Del Diavolo. Recent discovery of the stereo master tapes of the original session, with an extra 25 minutes of music, is featured on the limited 1500 unit special edition Legend CD 32 DLX, released July, 2010, as a 26-track 74:34 CD.

See also
 List of American films of 1971
 List of films shot in Almería
 List of Spaghetti Western films

References

External links
 
 
 
 Fort Bowie/Spanish on-location set

1970 films
1970 Western (genre) films
Italian drama films
American Western (genre) films
Western (genre) cavalry films
Films about deserters
Films directed by Burt Kennedy
Films produced by Dino De Laurentiis
Films shot in Almería
Films scored by Piero Piccioni
1970 drama films
Films shot in Italy
Films shot in Yugoslavia
English-language Italian films
English-language Yugoslav films
Yugoslav drama films
1970s English-language films
1970s American films
1970s Italian films